Pedomoecus is a genus of early smoky wing sedges in the family Apataniidae. There is one described species in Pedomoecus, P. sierra.

References

Further reading

 
 
 

Trichoptera genera
Articles created by Qbugbot
Integripalpia